Britt Ellen Eckerstrom (born May 28, 1993) is a retired American soccer player who played as a goalkeeper for Portland Thorns FC of the National Women's Soccer League (NWSL). She previously played for the Western New York Flash.

Club career

Penn State Nittany Lions
Eckerstrom won a national title with the Penn State Nittany Lions in 2015. She did not concede a single goal in that year's NCAA tournament. In 2016, she was awarded the Big Ten Medal of Honor, which recognizes one male and one female student from the graduating class of each Big Ten member school, for demonstrating joint athletic and academic excellence throughout their college career.

In 2013, she played with the Ottawa Fury. In 2014, she joined the Colorado Pride.

Western New York Flash
Eckerstrom was drafted in the 3rd round of the 2016 NWSL College Draft by Western New York Flash.

Portland Thorns
On March 8, 2017, Eckerstrom was traded to the Portland Thorns for two fourth round picks in the 2018 NWSL College Draft.

Loan to Newcastle Jets
In October 2017, Eckerstrom was loaned to Australian club Newcastle Jets for the 2017–18 W-League season, along with fellow Americans Katie Stengel, Tori Huster and Arin Gilliland.

Eckerstrom returned to the Jets in October 2018 ahead of the 2018–19 W-League season. She played every minute for the Jets, tallying 61 saves over the course of the season. 

She announced her retirement from professional soccer on Instagram on January 19, 2021.

References

External links
 US Soccer player profile
 Portland Thorns player profile
Penn State bio

1993 births
Living people
American women's soccer players
Women's association football goalkeepers
Penn State Nittany Lions women's soccer players
Western New York Flash players
Portland Thorns FC players
Newcastle Jets FC (A-League Women) players
National Women's Soccer League players
Sportspeople from Rockville, Maryland
Soccer players from Maryland
Western New York Flash draft picks
American people of Swedish descent
People from Germantown, Maryland
Ottawa Fury (women) players
USL W-League (1995–2015) players
American expatriate women's soccer players
American expatriate sportspeople in Canada
Expatriate women's soccer players in Canada